Bambi Meets Godzilla is a 1969 black-and-white animated short student film created entirely by Marv Newland. Less than two minutes long, the film is seen as a classic of animation; it was listed #38 in the book The 50 Greatest Cartoons (1994).

Plot
The opening credits, consisting entirely of roles filled by Newland himself, scroll over Bambi minding his own business while William Tell (1829)'s "Call to the Dairy Cows" plays in the background.  After the credits, he's interrupted by Godzilla's foot squashing him (set to the final chord of The Beatles' "A Day in the Life" slowed down to half-speed). After a moment, the closing credits appear alongside the image of Godzilla's foot atop Bambi. The closing credits give acknowledgement to Tokyo "for their help in obtaining Godzilla for this film". Godzilla's toe claws wiggle once and the cartoon ends.

Cast
 Walt Disney Jr. as Bambi
 Adriana Caselotti as Studio Owner

Screenings and distribution
In 1973, Bambi Meets Godzilla was paired with John Magnuson's Thank You Mask Man by Randy Finley and Specialty Films in Seattle and released widely under the title The King of Hearts and His Loyal Short Subjects. The program ran in repertory theaters across America for several years. The short was also included on VHS home video releases of Godzilla 1985 and Fantastic Animation Festival.

Sequels and remakes
In 1976, the black-and-white sequel Bambi's Revenge was released.

In 1999, the 3D-animated color sequel Son of Bambi Meets Godzilla was released.

In 2013, animator Coda Gardner did a meticulous frame-by-frame recreation of the original via tracing the film frames and assembling the animation via digital video editing.

Preservation
The Academy Film Archive preserved Bambi Meets Godzilla in 2009.

See also
Bring Me the Head of Charlie Brown
Escalation
Mickey Mouse in Vietnam

References

External links
 
 Bambi Meets Godzilla on AllMovie
 Bambi Meets Godzilla on Dailymotion

1969 films
1969 animated films
American animated comedy films
1960s animated short films
1960s monster movies
Animated crossover films
Fan films based on Godzilla
1960s English-language films
American parody films
Godzilla films
Canadian black-and-white films
Disney parodies
Canadian animated short films
American animated short films
1960s American animated films
1969 short films
1960s parody films
1969 comedy films
Animated films about animals
Bambi
American student films
Canadian student films
Animated films without speech
Films about deer and moose
1960s Canadian films
Canadian comedy short films
American comedy short films